South Korea participated in the 1954 Asian Games held in the city of Manila, Philippines. The games were held from May 1, 1954 to May 9, 1954. The South Korea was ranked third with eight gold medals in this edition of the Asiad.

Medal summary

Medal table

Medalists

References

Korea, South
1954
Asian Games